The Northern Military Region is one of the five military regions of the Egyptian Armed Forces. It is headquartered in Alexandria. It may include the Alexandria, Beheira, Kafr el-Sheikh Governorate and Gharbia Governorates.

The current structure of the Northern Military Region:

 3rd Mechanized Infantry Division
 222nd Mechanized Infantry Brigade 
 110th Mechanized Infantry Brigade
 199th Armored Brigade
 192nd Med. Range Artillery Brigade
 76th Independent Armored Brigade 
 One Independent medium range Artillery Brigade 
Among previous region commanders were Staff Brigadiers Abdel Fattah al-Sisi, now president, and Mohammed Majid Faraj. Major General Khaled Shawqi is the Current commander.

Gulf War Participation 

During the Gulf War, the 3rd Mechanized Division was part of the corps sized Egyptian forces where it served as part of the Arab forces during the liberation of Kuwait alongside the 4th Armoured Division.

References

Military regions of Egypt